Gordon West (24 April 1943 – 10 June 2012) was an English professional football goalkeeper. He won three international caps in a career that included a long stint at Everton.

Club career

Blackpool
West played as a defender for Barnsley, Don and Dearne Boys, but when accompanying a friend to a trial with Blackpool decided to try out as a goalkeeper. The Lancashire club signed him, and West made his debut for Blackpool at the age of 17. After 33 League games for the Tangerines, he signed for Everton in March 1962 for £27,000, then a British record for a goalkeeper, replacing Albert Dunlop.

Everton
In his first full season on Merseyside, West won the 1962–63 Football League First Division with Everton. He became the club's first-choice goalkeeper for more than ten years, forming a partnership with central defender and captain, Brian Labone. In that period he won the FA Cup in 1966 and was a runner-up in 1968. In 1969–70 Everton won the league again, with West keeping 21 clean sheets, still a club record. He made 399 appearances for the Toffees and retired in 1973.

Tranmere Rovers

West came out of retirement after three years to play briefly for cross-Mersey rivals Tranmere Rovers. He made seventeen League appearances for the Wirral club.

International career

West won three caps for England. He turned down a place in the 1970 FIFA World Cup squad because he wanted to stay at home with his family.

Life after football

After giving up football, West worked in security at RAF Woodvale and became an after dinner speaker. Former Everton and Wales goalkeeper Neville Southall campaigned for West to be rewarded with a testimonial game by Everton for his eleven years of service. West lived in Brighton-le-Sands, Merseyside. On 10 June 2012, West died of cancer in hospital.

His funeral was attended by Martin Buchan, Colin Harvey, Dave Hickson, John Hurst, Cliff Marshall, Peter Reid, George Telfer, Derek Temple, Tommy Wright and former player and manager Joe Royle, along with former chairman Sir Philip Carter, who paid tribute at the service.

Honours
Everton
Football League First Division: 1962–63, 1969–70
FA Cup: 1965–66; Runner-up 1967–68
FA Charity Shield: 1963, 1970

References

External links
England profile

1943 births
2012 deaths
English footballers
England international footballers
Blackpool F.C. players
Everton F.C. players
Tranmere Rovers F.C. players
UEFA Euro 1968 players
English Football League players
Association football goalkeepers
People from Darfield, South Yorkshire
English Football League representative players
Sportspeople from Yorkshire
FA Cup Final players